Sympistis nemum is a moth of the family Noctuidae first described by James T. Troubridge in 2008. It is found in the US state of Utah.

References

nenun
Moths described in 2008